The 2017 BNP Paribas de Nouvelle-Calédonie was a professional tennis tournament played on hard courts. It was the fourteenth edition of the tournament which is part of the 2017 ATP Challenger Tour. It took place in Nouméa, New Caledonia on 2–7 January 2017.

Singles main-draw entrants

Seeds

 1 Rankings are as of December 26, 2016.

Other entrants
The following players received wildcards into the singles main draw:
  Alexander Blasco 
  Romain Bousquet
  Nicolas N'Godrela
  Joanick Pattoua

The following players received entry from the qualifying draw:
  Jake Delaney
  Peđa Krstin
  Luca Margaroli
  Finn Tearney

Champions

Singles

 Adrian Mannarino def.  Nikola Milojević 6–3, 7–5.

Doubles

 Quentin Halys /  Tristan Lamasine def.  Adrián Menéndez Maceiras /  Stefano Napolitano 7–6(11–9), 6–1.

External links
Official Website

BNP Paribas de Nouvelle-Caledonie
Internationaux de Nouvelle-Calédonie
Inter
2017 in French tennis